No. 490 (NZ) Squadron was an anti-submarine and maritime reconnaissance squadron of Coastal Command established for service during the Second World War. It was a New Zealand squadron formed under Article XV of the Empire Air Training Plan. Although many of its flying personnel were drawn from the Royal New Zealand Air Force, the squadron served under the operational and administrative command of the Royal Air Force.

Formed in March 1943, No. 490 Squadron was based at Jui, near Freetown, in West Africa and initially flew the Consolidated Catalina flying boat. Becoming operational in July, its work mainly consisted of escorting convoys, carrying out maritime patrols, and search and rescue missions along the coast of West Africa. It began using the Short Sunderland flying boat in 1944 but by this time the threat that U-boats posed to convoys in the area was largely non-existent and the squadron saw little enemy action. It was disbanded in August 1945.

Background
In the mid-1930s, the Royal Air Force (RAF) was in the process of expanding and required an increasing number of suitable flying personnel. A number of schemes were implemented for New Zealanders to obtain short-service commissions in the RAF with the intention of then transferring to the Royal New Zealand Air Force (RNZAF) in the future. This led to over 500 New Zealanders serving in the RAF by the time of the outbreak of the Second World War.

At around the same time there was discussion between the governments of Britain, Australia, Canada and New Zealand to facilitate the co-ordination of training of air crew in the event of hostilities. This led to the implementation of the Empire Air Training Scheme (ETAS) in December 1939. Under this agreement, New Zealand committed to initially supply 880 full trained pilots for the RAF, with another 520 pilots being trained to an elementary standard annually. As each of the Dominion governments desired its personnel to serve together, the ETAS had a clause, Article XV, that allowed for the establishment of squadrons with personnel from the respective countries. In theory, the Dominions would supply the ground crew as well as flying personnel. However, in New Zealand's case, there was a reluctance to maintain RNZAF squadrons in Britain so the decision was made to allow for the formation of squadrons within the RAF designated as being New Zealand. These squadrons, known as Article XV squadrons, were formed around a cadre of New Zealand flying personnel already serving in the RAF but supplemented by newly trained pilots from the RNZAF, with administrative and ground crew being predominantly British.

History

No. 490 Squadron was formed 28 March 1943 at Jui near Freetown in what is now present-day Sierra Leone. The last of the seven New Zealand Article XV squadrons, it had been intended that the squadron would be located so it could operate over the Indian Ocean, but the need for more Coastal Command squadrons for coverage of the convoy routes along the west coast of Africa dictated a change in destination to Jui. The first personnel to arrive at Jui, located on a strip of land of extending into an estuary and surrounded by mangrove swamps, was the ground crew. The aircrew began flying their aircraft in from Scotland, where they had received training at Stranraer, in June. The unit was led by Wing Commander D. W. Baird, who had previously commanded RNZAF forces in Fiji.

Equipped with Consolidated Catalina flying boats, No. 490 Squadron was tasked with patrolling for submarines, escorting convoys, and search and rescue missions. Its first operation was as a convoy escort on 2 July. This involved a Catalina flying station over the seamen, who had taken to life rafts, while a second guided another ship to pick them up. Just a few days later, a U-boat was sighted and attacked. Four depth charges were dropped and appeared to have damaged the steering of the U-boat, which then submerged. However, most patrols were uneventful as U-boat activity was on the decline and their crews very cautious, operating at the fringe of the squadron's air coverage. In early December, there was a brief flurry of action when a ship was torpedoed near Freetown and the squadron sought out the attacking U-boat, but without success. 

Wing Commander B. S. Nicholl took over in December 1943 and oversaw the squadron's conversion to Short Sunderland flying boats the following year. By this time, an advance base for the squadron had been established at Fisherman's Lake in Liberia. The U-boat threat had now largely disappeared but the squadron still escorted convoys and carried out patrols. Despite the boredom, there was still risk to flying personnel, often through the storms that affected the area of operations. One Sunderland was forced down  from land due to damage from a storm on 13 July 1944. Two crew members were lost, trapped in the sinking aircraft, and the others spent 24 hours in life rafts without food and water before being rescued.

In October 1944, Wing Commander T. S. Gill was appointed commander of the squadron. It flew its last operation on 6 May 1945, and when it became obvious that No. 490 Squadron would not be needed in Japan, the squadron was disbanded on 1 August.

Operational summary
Of all the New Zealand squadrons of the RAF, No. 490 Squadron saw the least action, but nonetheless flew 463 operational sorties, totalling 4853 hours. One Distinguished Flying Cross was awarded to squadron personnel.

The squadron's motto, in Māori, the indigenous language of New Zealand, was Taniwha kei runga which translates as "Taniwha in the air". Taniwha are mythical intelligent monsters in Māori legend, occasionally but not particularly accurately translated as "dragons". An arm couped below the elbow, holding in the hand a patu (club) was selected as the squadron's badge.

Commanding officers
The following served as commanding officers of No. 490 Squadron:
 Wing Commander D. W. Baird (June–December 1943); 
 Wing Commander B. S. Nicholl (December 1943–October 1944); 
 Wing Commander T. F. Gill (October 1944–August 1945).

Notes

References

External links

 Australian site on Article XV
 Canadian site on Article XV 

490
Military units and formations established in 1943
Military units and formations disestablished in 1945